Glória Maria Matta da Silva (15 August 1949 – 2 February 2023) was a Brazilian journalist, reporter, and television host. With a career that spanned since the 60's, she is widely considered the first television reporter and TV host of African descent to achieve national success in Brazil.

Early life
Maria grew up in a low-income household in the suburbs of Rio de Janeiro; her father worked as a tailor and her mother as a housewife. 

Maria lived with her grandmother after her parents divorced and was told her stories about her great-grandfather, who was hanged in the mountains of Minas Gerais state. Daughter of an enslaved mother, her grandmother was also a beneficiary of the 1871 Law of Free Birth and was thus born free. Her grandmother taught her that she needed to work to be free.

Career
In January 1970, Maria met with the news directors of Globo TV, and shortly after became the special reporter for Globo Repórter, sometimes co-presenting alongside Sergio Chapelin. Glória Maria was the first black television reporter in Brazil, the first to present the seven o’clock news, and the first to command Fantástico. She had to face many barriers and obstacles to become a successful journalist and reporter.

For one year, Glória Maria worked two jobs, including weekends, before she acquired a position at Globo. She would start her shift at Globo at 8:00 a.m. and would leave at 8:00 p.m. Afterwards, she would attend pre-college prep courses and then go home to sleep for an hour. Glória would wake up in the morning to go to her job at a telephone company.

Maria received her degree in journalism from the Pontifical Catholic University of Rio de Janeiro. After graduating, she went on to presenting news on several Globo TV programs such as RJTV, Jornal Nacional, and Fantástico. Soon after, she became known for reports that she would do while traveling to exotic places such as the Sahara Desert, and even covering events like the Falklands War in 1982. She hosted Fantastico for ten years and took a two year sabbatical to travel to places such as the Himalayas before returning and taking the second position as a Globo reporter. She accumulated more than ten complete passports throughout her life and interviewed several celebrities, such as Michael Jackson,Madonna, and Freddie Mercury.

Personal life
Maria was married but later separated because she and her spouse did not want to live together. She did not consider having children but  later became a single mother to her daughters Laura and Maria whom she adopted as sisters from Salvador, Bahia in 2009.

Death
Maria died on 2 February 2023, in Rio de Janeiro as a consequence of a metastatic cancer that started in her lungs and spread to her brain. She was aged 73.

Philanthropy
Maria saw children in need during many of her travels and decided to dedicate her time to travel around the world helping others. She spent time in India volunteering to help care for and feed children and beggars in the country's poorest cities. She also served children in poor areas of Nigeria. She continued her efforts when returning to Brazil and met her daughters.

References

External links 

1949 births
2023 deaths
20th-century Brazilian women
21st-century Brazilian women
Afro-Brazilian women
Afro-Brazilian television hosts
Age controversies
Brazilian television presenters
Brazilian women journalists
Brazilian journalists
People from Rio de Janeiro (city)
Brazilian women philanthropists
Pontifical Catholic University of Rio de Janeiro alumni
Brazilian women television presenters
Brazilian philanthropists
Deaths from cancer in Rio de Janeiro (state)
Deaths from lung cancer in Brazil
20th-century journalists
21st-century journalists